Lara Juliette Sanders is a German director, producer and TV personality. She first gained media attention after winning a lifetime achievement award for her period-spanning feature documentary "Celebration of Flight".

Career 
Sanders studied communication science  and business administration at the Ludwig Maximilians University in Munich and worked as a freelance journalist for the Bayerischer Rundfunk and ZDF. From 1996 she worked at Westdeutscher Rundfunk as a producer and host while script supervising at Odeon Film. Subsequently, Sanders was responsible for the development of new television pilots at Teletime TV Production as an executive producer.
In 2000 Sanders left her hometown in Germany and met the Swedish pilot Daniel Rundstroem on the island of Dominica, who is the real-life character of Sander's debut film Celebration of Flight. After filming for over 4 years, the award-winning feature-documentary was completed and broadcast in Germany (ZDF, Arte ), Italy ( RAI ), Sweden ( SVT), Finland ( YLE ), Denmark ( DR ) Norway ( NRK ), and France (France2). Lara received widespread acclaim from critics and audiences in regards to her directorial debut.

Personal life 
In 2020 Sanders married Eritrean actor and businessman Samuel Mekonnen.

Selected filmography

Director and writer 
 2016 Truth for Foods
 2007 The Real Daktari
 2007 Celebration of Flight

Producer 
 2016 Truth for Foods
 2016 
 2007 The Real Daktari
 2007 Celebration of Flight

Awards 
 Special Jury Prize for Celebration of Flight at Barcelona International Film Festival.
 Best Documentary award for Celebration of Flight at Gloria Film Festival. 
 Best Feature Documentary Director's Award for Celebration of Flight at Texas Film Festival

References

External links 

Living people
Mass media people from Bavaria
1969 births
Ludwig Maximilian University of Munich alumni